The 2018 Notre Dame Fighting Irish men's soccer team represented University of Notre Dame during the 2018 NCAA Division I men's soccer season. It was the program's 41st season. It was the program's 6th season competing in the Atlantic Coast Conference.  The Fighting Irish were be led by head coach Chad Riley, in his first year.

Background

The 2017 Notre Dame men's soccer team finished the season with an 11–7–2 overall record and a 3–3–2 ACC record.  The Fighting Irish were seeded seventh–overall in the 2017 ACC Men's Soccer Tournament, where they lost to Virginia in the semifinals.  The Fighting Irish earned an at-large bid into the 2017 NCAA Division I Men's Soccer Tournament for the fifth season in a row.  As the twelfth–overall seed in the tournament, Notre Dame hosted Wisconsin.  Notre Dame was upset 0–1 in overtime to end their season.

At the end of the season, one Fighting Irish men's soccer player was selected in the 2018 MLS SuperDraft: Jon Gallagher.

During the offseason, Bobby Clark retired as head coach and was replaced by Chad Riely.

Player movement

Players leaving

Players arriving

Squad

Roster

Updated August 23, 2018

Team management

Source:

Schedule
Source 

|-
!colspan=6 style=";"| Exhibition
|-

|-
!colspan=6 style=""| Regular Season

|-
!colspan=6 style=";"| ACC Tournament

|-
!colspan=6 style=""| NCAA Tournament

Awards and honors

2019 MLS Super Draft

Source:

Rankings

References

2018
2018 Atlantic Coast Conference men's soccer season
2018 in sports in Indiana
American men's college soccer teams 2018 season
2018 NCAA Division I Men's Soccer Tournament participants